This page presents the results of the men's volleyball tournament at the 1962 Asian Games, which was held from 25 August to 2 September 1962 in Jakarta, Indonesia.

Results

Preliminary round

Pool A

|}

Pool B

|}

Pool C

|}

Classification 7th–9th

|}

Final round

|}

Final standing

References
 Results

External links
OCA official website

Men's volleyball